Warriors of Fate, known in Japan as , is a side-scrolling beat-'em-up game produced by Capcom. It is the second arcade game based on the Tenchi wo Kurau manga, following Dynasty Wars. Originally released to arcades in 1992, home versions of the Sega Saturn and PlayStation were released in 1996. A version for mobile phones followed in 2005. Capcom later included an emulated version of the arcade original as part of the Capcom Beat 'Em Up Bundle released digitally for the Nintendo Switch, PlayStation 4, Xbox One, and Windows on September 18, 2018.

Gameplay

Warriors of Fate is a beat'em up with nine stages. Each contains large mobs including spearman, archers, strongmen, bomb-wielding opponents, and at least one boss. There can be up to three players on-screen at the same time. Using two buttons, Attack and Jump, the characters all have standard moves typical of Capcom side-scrollers of the day. One or more of Wei's generals appears at the end of each stage as a boss - e.g., Li Dian, Xiahou Dun, Xu Chu, Cao Ren, Zhang Liao, Xu Huang, and the infamous Lu Bu as the final boss. After defeating them all, Cao Cao himself must be confronted and defeated before he escapes. The game also has two bonus stages that require rapid pressing of buttons.

There is also a variety of weapons in the game which can be picked up. As with most side-scrollers, food is used to replenish health and can be found in various breakable containers in the game levels. One notable feature of the game is the ability to summon a warhorse which adds more attacks to the characters, generally involving pole-arms (except the long bow for Huang Zhong). Each character except Zhao Yun was given a special wrestling throw of their own. Unlike the first game, Dynasty Wars, Liu Bei is not playable. The playable characters are Guan Yu, Zhang Fei, Zhao Yun, Huang Zhong, four of the famous Five Tiger Generals, and Wei Yan. (In the US version, they are named Portor, Kassar, Subutai, Kadan, and Abaka respectively.)

Story
In the Japanese version, Tenchi wo Kurau II follows Liu Bei's plight in Jingzhou from the Romance of the Three Kingdoms, a history-based 14th century novel from China by Luo Guanzhong, set in the Three Kingdoms period as Cao Cao sets to invade his lands after the death of Dong Zhuo and recruiting his general Lu Bu to his army. In Warriors of  Fate, Shu Han, led by Liu Bei, as in the novel, is everything "good" and "righteous", while Wei, led by the ever-suspicious and cunning Cao Cao, is portrayed as "evil" and "bad". Liu Bei's warriors begin by fighting Cao Cao's forces at the Battle of Bowang, then Battle of Changban, then finally join up with Sun Quan to fight at the Battle of Red Cliff. If the Five Tigers slay Cao Cao, Wu and Shu join forces, unite Wei, return the Han back to rule and restore peace; if not, Cao Cao escapes and history continues as intended with the land in turmoil and the eventual demise of Shu.

In the English adaptation, however, the Three Kingdoms theme was lost, and most names have been changed to names of Mongolian origin. The story takes place in a fictional realm where the evil overlord Akkila-Orkhan (originally Cao Cao) of Shang-Lo tries to conquer his neighbouring countries, converting them into ruin and despair. Kuan-Ti (originally Liu Bei), with the aid of the five great warriors, stands up against the conquering shadow and fights to defend his people and lands.

Reception 

In Japan, Game Machine listed Warriors of Fate on their December 15, 1992 issue as being the most-popular arcade game at the time. In North America, RePlay reported Warriors of Fate to be the fifth most-popular arcade game at the time. Play Meter also listed Warriors of Fate to be the forty-fifth most-popular arcade game at the time.

References 

1992 video games
Arcade video games
Capcom beat 'em ups
Capcom Power System Changer games
Cooperative video games
CP System Dash games
Mobile games
PlayStation (console) games
Sega Saturn games
Video games based on anime and manga
Video games based on Romance of the Three Kingdoms
Video games developed in Japan